The 1994 Bristol City Council election took place on 5 May 1994 to elect members of Bristol City Council in England. This was on the same day as other local elections. One third of seats were up for election. The Bristol Party was formed by Bristol Rovers fans to campaign for a new stadium for the club. There was a general swing from the Conservatives and Greens to the Liberal Democrats, reflecting the beginning of the Conservative decline nationally and also the Liberal Democrat recovery after the merger troubles.

Ward results

The change is calculated using the results when these actual seats were last contested, i.e. the 1990 election.

Ashley

Avonmouth

Bedminster

Bishopston

Cabot

Clifton

Cotham

Easton

Eastville

Filwood

Frome Vale

Henbury

Henleaze

Hillfields

Horfield

Kingsweston

Lawrence Hill

Lockleaze

Redland

Southmead

Southville

Stoke Bishop

Westbury-on-Trym

Sources
 Bristol Evening Post 6 May 1994

1994
1994 English local elections
1990s in Bristol